Sapria is a genus of parasitic flowering plants in the family Rafflesiaceae. It grows within roots of Vitis and Tetrastigma. The genus is limited to the tropical forests of South and Southeast Asia.

The flowers of Sapria are about 20 cm in diameter, bright red with yellow or white dots, unisexual and dioecious. In contrast with the related genus Rafflesia the flowers have 10 lobes.

Species
Four species are described.

References

Griffith, Proc. Linn. Soc. Lond. 1: 216. 1844.
Sapria in Flora of China 5: 271. 2003.
A rare root parasitic plant (Sapria himalayana Griffith.) in Namdapha National Park, northeastern India in Current Science, Vol. 85, No. 12, 25 December 2003

External links

Rafflesiaceae
Malpighiales genera
Dioecious plants